Concurrent means happening at the same time. Concurrency, concurrent, or concurrence may refer to:

Law 
 Concurrence, in jurisprudence, the need to prove both actus reus and mens rea
 Concurring opinion (also called a "concurrence"), a legal opinion which supports the conclusion, though not always the reasoning, of the majority.
 Concurrent estate, a concept in property law
 Concurrent resolution, a legislative measure passed by both chambers of the United States Congress
 Concurrent sentences, in criminal law, periods of imprisonment that are served simultaneously

Computing 

 Concurrency (computer science), the property of program, algorithm, or problem decomposition into order-independent or partially-ordered units
 Concurrent computing, the overlapping execution of multiple interacting computational tasks
 Concurrence (quantum computing), a measure used in quantum information theory
 Concurrent Computer Corporation, an American computer systems manufacturer
 Concurrent DOS, Digital Research's multiuser multitasking operating system, with "Concurrent" once being their registered trademark
 Concurrence, a presentation program designed by Lighthouse Design for NeXTSTEP which inspired Keynote by Apple

Engineering 
 Concurrent engineering,  an engineering methodology emphasizing the parallelisation of tasks 
 Concurrent Design Facility, an assessment center of the European Space Agency using concurrent engineering methods

Other 
 Concurrent lines, in geometry, multiple lines or curves intersecting at a single point
 Concurrency (road), an instance of one physical road bearing two or more different route numbers
 Concurrent (Easter), the weekday of 24 March Julian used to calculate Julian Easter
 Concurrent enrolment, a process in the US allowing students to enroll at a university or college while still in high school